The Société de Transport Interurbains du Val d'Oise, or STIVO, is the bus company operating urban buses in Cergy-Pontoise in the département of Val-d'Oise, France. The company was created in 1974 by Cars Giraux and Cars Lacroix with the task of transporting the increasing population of the new town of Cergy-Pontoise. In the 1990s, the company sold its services under the StAN. The StAN's line were numbered 4xx along with the bus line numbering scheme in Île-de-France. In 1994, the StAN created two new lines, 434N and 434S, orbiting the new town and serving most of the peripheral communes, and introduced a new livery of turquoise and light blue with a new logo in the shape of an N, symbolising the meander of the river Oise around which the city is built.

On 17 September 2004, STIVO introduced a new livery. Couleur et matière, specialist in road equipment livery, conceived the new graphical identity jointly with the new town's council's change of logo. Application of the livery consisted of light paint for the background and vinyl shapes .

Fleet

Renault Agora S
Renault Agora L
Renault PR100

Bus companies of France